Baoding, formerly known as Baozhou and Qingyuan, is a prefecture-level city in central Hebei province, approximately   southwest of Beijing. Baoding is among 13 Chinese cities with a population of over 10 million, ranking seventh.
One can also note that Zhuozhou City in the northern part has now grown into part of the Beijing built-up (or metro) area.

History
Baoding is a city with a history dating back to the Western Han Dynasty. It was destroyed by the Mongols in the 13th century, but after the Mongols established the Yuan Dynasty, it was rebuilt. It acquired the name "Baoding" during the Yuan dynasty — the name is roughly interpreted as "protecting the capital", referring to the city's proximity to Beijing. Baoding served for many years as the capital of Zhili, and was a significant centre of culture in the Ming Dynasty and early Qing Dynasty. During the Boxer Rebellion, Boxer rebels killed a Turk, two Swiss, and an Italian in Baoding.

On August 1, 1949, the people's Government of Hebei province was established, Baoding was the capital of the province, and the city of Baoding was a provincial municipality. On August 9, the administrative inspector's office of the Baoding district was established, and it was established as the administrative inspector's office of the county district.

In May 1958, the capital of Hebei was moved to Tianjin.

In January 1966, the provincial capital was moved from Tianjin to Baoding.

In February 1968, the provincial capital moved to Shijiazhuang.

In December 1994, the Baoding area merged with Baoding to become a provincial city.

In April 2017, the Central Committee of the Communist Party of China and the State Council announced the decision to transform Baoding's Xiong, Rongcheng, and Anxin counties into Xiong'an New Area, a new development area of national significance, with a focus on innovation, sustainability and quality of life, following the success of Shenzhen Special Economic Zone and Shanghai's Pudong New Area.

Geography
Baoding is located in the west-central portion of Hebei province and lies on the North China Plain, with the Taihang Mountains to the west. Bordering prefecture-level cities in the province are Zhangjiakou to the north, Langfang and Cangzhou to the east, and Shijiazhuang and Hengshui to the south. Baoding also borders Beijing to the northeast and Shanxi to the west.

Elevations in Baoding's administrative area decrease from northwest to southeast. Moving southeast from this area, one encounters low-lying mountains and hills, taking up 18.9% of the prefecture's area. Further to the east lies generally flat terrain of  elevation. Here the primary rivers are the Xiaoyi River,Fu River,Bao River(),Ping River(),Juma River(), Yishui River, Tang River,Cao River(),Zhulong River(), Qingshui River,andSha Rivers.Baiyangdian Lake, the largest natural lake in northern China, can be found nearby.

Climate
Baoding has a continental, monsoon-influenced humid continental climate/semi-arid climate (Köppen Dwa/BSk), characterised by hot, humid summers due to the East Asian monsoon, and generally cold, windy, very dry winters that reflect the influence of the vast Siberian anticyclone. Spring can bear witness to sandstorms blowing in from the Mongolian steppe, accompanied by rapidly warming, but generally dry, conditions. Autumn is similar to spring in temperature and lack of rainfall. The annual rainfall, about 60% of which falls in July and August alone, is highly variable and not reliable. There are 2,500 to 2,900 hours of bright sunshine annually, and the frost-free period lasts 165−210 days.

Administrative divisions

Bǎodìng prefecture-level city consists of 5 municipal districts, 4 county-level cities, 15 counties:

 Dissolved districts: Beishi District and Nanshi District

Demographics

According to the 2010 Census, the residence population stood at 11,194,382, an increase of 605,100 (5.71%) from 2000. The male-female ratio was 101.94:100. Children aged up to 14 numbered 1,915,800 (17.11% of the population), citizens 15 to 64 numbered 8,370,600 (74.78%), and 65+ numbered 908,000 (8.11%). The urban area of Baoding made of 5 urban Districts had a population of around 2,739,887 (2010 census). The overwhelming majority of the population is Han Chinese. The language of Baoding is Mandarin Chinese — specifically, the Baoding dialect of Ji-Lu Mandarin. Despite Baoding's proximity to Beijing, the Chinese spoken in Baoding is not particularly close to the Beijing dialect — rather, it is more closely related to Tianjin dialect.

Economy
Baoding is located in the centre of the Bohai Rim economic area which includes Beijing, Tianjin and Shijiazhuang. One of the largest employers in Baoding is China Lucky Film, the largest photosensitive materials and magnetic recording media manufacturer in China. And, Yingli group, 2010 World Cup sponsor, has its headquarters in Baoding, who is the Global Top 10 solar panel manufacturer. More renowned companies include ZhongHang HuiTeng Windpower Equipment Co., Ltd (Wind Turbine), Baoding Tianwei Group Co., Ltd (Transformer) and Great Wall Motor.

In April 2017, an area in Baoding was designated as a Xiong'an New Area, a development zone of initially 100 km2 and up to 2000 km2, the site of what will eventually be a new city and the hub of the Beijing-Tinajin-Hebei development area.
 Baoding High-tech Industrial Development Zone

Great Wall Motors Company Limited is a Chinese automobile manufacturer headquartered in Baoding, Hebei, China. The company is named after the Great Wall of China and was formed in 1984. It is China's largest sport utility vehicle (SUV) and pick-up truck producer. It sells passenger cars and trucks under the Great Wall brand and SUVs under the Haval and WEY brands.

In 2016, Great Wall Motors set a historical sales record of 1,074,471 cars worldwide, increased by 26% compared to 2015.

Renewable energy
Baoding city has one of China's biggest plants which manufacture blades used in wind turbine generators, catering mainly to the domestic market. Tianwei Wind Power Technology is one of the three main plants in Baoding that produces wind turbine generators. It wheeled out its first 20 turbines in 2008, and it will produce 150 units in 2009 and another 500 in 2010. Nevertheless, Baoding is currently listed as the most polluted city in China.

Transport

Baoding has good connections to other cities, being located on one of the main routes in and out of Beijing. The Jingshi Expressway connects the two cities, and Baoding is also the western terminus of the Baojin Expressway linking Baoding with Tianjin, which is one out of two nearest ports (Huanghua is the other one). The Jingguang Railway provides frequent services to Beijing West railway station. On 30 December 2012, a new Baoding station was opened, while the old train station was closed for passengers. Baoding East railway station lies to the east on the Beijing–Guangzhou–Shenzhen–Hong Kong high-speed railway.On October 1, 2018, the east square of Baoding Railway Station was officially put into use, and the east station building of the railway station was also opened at the same time.

Military
Baoding is headquarters of the 38th Mechanized Group Army of the People's Liberation Army, one of the three group armies that comprise the Beijing Military Region responsible for defending the PRC capital.

Culture

Perhaps the best-known item to supposedly originate in Baoding are Baoding Balls, which can be used to relax one's keyboard hand and strengthen one's wrist. The most famous local specialty food is the Donkey Burger.

Anxin County is home to the Quantou Village Music Association, a well known traditional music group performing on guan (oboes), sheng (mouth organs), and percussion. The village of Quantou is located on an island in Lake Baiyangdian.

The city's streets follow a rough grid pattern, although this is less obvious in the older part of the city. The traditional main street of old Baoding is Yuhua Road, running from the city's centre to its eastern edge — most of Baoding's historic buildings are located in this area, along with some of its larger shopping centres. Other major streets include Dongfeng Road and Chaoyang Avenue. There is a ring road around the city.

Baoding is home to Hebei University, North China Electric Power University with other 3 universities and 12 colleges.

Historic sites

Baoding contains a number of notable historic sites. In the city proper, there can be found a historic provincial governor's mansion and an ancient lotus garden. In the hills to the northwest of the city, near the suburb of Mancheng, there are the Mancheng Han Tombs, where Prince Liu Sheng and his wife Dou Wan were buried.

The greater Baoding administrative area has 16 designated state-level cultural relics:
 Yan State Capital Relics (475BC-221BC, Yixian County)
 Great Wall at Zijinguan Pass (1368–1644, Yixian County and Laiyuan County)
 Stele of Lao Tzu's Tao Te Ching (618-907, Yixian County)
 Western Qing Tombs (1730–1915, Yixian County)
 Geyuan Temple (916-1125, Laiyuan County)
 Ciyun Pavilion (1306, Dingxing County)
 Yicihui Stone Pillar (550-577, Dingxing County)
 Kaiyuan Temple (960-1127, Dingzhou County)
 Kaishan Temple (618-907, Gaobeidian County)
 Dingzhou Porcelain Kiln Relic (960-1127, Quyang County)
 Beiyue Temple (386-543, Quyang County)
 Jin-cha-ji Border Region Headquarters Ruins (1938, Fuping County)
 Ranzhuang Underground Tunnel (1937–1945, Qingyuan County)
 Mancheng Han Tombs (154BC-113BC, Mancheng County)
 Zhili Provincial Governor Office (1730–1911, Baoding)
 Historical Site of the Baoding Military Academy (1902–1923)

Notable people
 Abbie Goodrich Chapin (1868-1956), American missionary teacher based in Baoding
 Chen Xu, Director of the Overseas Chinese Affairs Office
 Fan Hongbin—gymnast, Olympic silver medalist in 1996 Summer Olympics
 Fan Ye—gymnast, 2003 World Artistic Gymnastics Championships balance beam gold medalist
 Guo Jingjing—diver and Olympic gold medalist in 2004 and 2008 Summer Olympics
 Qian Hong—swimmer and Olympic gold medalist in 1992 Summer Olympics
 Shi Changxu—materials scientist, recipient of the 2010 State Preeminent Science and Technology Award
 Tie Ning—author, president of the China Writers Association
 Wei Jianjun—billionaire, chairman of Great Wall Motors
 Yan Su—Chinese playwright and lyricist
 Xie Jun—chess grandmaster and Women's World Chess Champion 1991-1996, 1999-2001

Sister cities
Baoding is twinned with:

,Charlotte, North Carolina,1987-09-29 
,Yonago, Tottori,1991-10-13 
,Saijō, Ehime,1994-9-21
,Hafnarfjörður,1994-10-09
,Kushima, Miyazaki,2000-11-20
,Dongdaemun District,Seoul,2001-02-19
,Gravenhurst, Ontario,2002-12-5
,Santiago de Veraguas,2006-12-15
,Sønderborg Municipality,2012-04-23

Gallery

See also

List of twin towns and sister cities in China

References

External links

 

 
Cities in Hebei
Prefecture-level divisions of Hebei